Gleison Rezende Vilela (born 28 December 1984), known as Gleison, is a Brazilian professional footballer playing for Nea Salamina in Cypriot First Division as a striker.

Club career
On 1 July 2014 Gleison signed a contract with Cypriot club Nea Salamina.

Honours
 Campeonato Catarinense 2008 in Figueirense
 Copa Rio 2016 in Friburguense

References

External links
 
 

1984 births
Living people
Brazilian footballers
Brazilian expatriate footballers
Expatriate footballers in Cyprus
Brazilian expatriate sportspeople in Cyprus
Cypriot First Division players
Clube Atlético Taquaritinga players
AEL Limassol players
Friburguense Atlético Clube players
Bangu Atlético Clube players
Comercial Futebol Clube (Ribeirão Preto) players
Figueirense FC players
Esporte Clube Democrata players
Doxa Katokopias FC players
Nea Salamis Famagusta FC players
Association football forwards